The Thin White Duke was the persona and character of the English musician David Bowie during 1975 and 1976. He is primarily identified with Bowie's 1976 album Station to Station and is mentioned by name in the title track, although Bowie had first begun to adopt the "Duke" persona during the preceding Young Americans tour and promotion in 1975. The persona's look and character are somewhat based on Thomas Jerome Newton, the humanoid alien played by Bowie in the 1976 film The Man Who Fell to Earth.

The Thin White Duke was a controversial figure due to ostensibly pro-fascist statements made by Bowie in press interviews during this period. Soon after making the comments, Bowie claimed that they were "theatrical" remarks made in character and did not reflect his actual views. In later years, he blamed his erratic behaviour during his mid-1970s Duke era on an "astronomical" use of hard drugs (particularly cocaine) while living in Los Angeles.

Bowie left California for Europe in late 1976 to improve his mental and physical well-being. He settled in West Berlin in early 1977, at which point he quietly retired the Thin White Duke persona. Some fans recognize the survival of the Thin White Duke through the Berlin Trilogy, and his ultimate demise on Lodger.

Development

David Bowie, who had experience performing in experimental theatre before becoming famous as a musician, began adopting different performing personae in the early 1970s, most notably the glam alien Ziggy Stardust. He famously retired Ziggy in 1973 at the end of the Ziggy Stardust Tour, and adopted the dystopian Halloween Jack persona for his Diamond Dogs album and most of the following tour.

An early version of the Thin White Duke character began to appear in late 1974 during the second leg of the tour. During this "plastic soul" lead-up to his Young Americans album, Bowie's hair was still orange, but it was cut shorter, and his stage costumes moderated from colorful glam outfits to more conventional dress clothes. The Thin White Duke was mentioned by name in the title track of Bowie's next album, Station to Station, and he appeared in that persona during the following Isolar Tour.

Bowie was significantly influenced by William S. Burroughs, whom he met in 1973, enthusiastically incorporating his 'cut-up' technique as a method to harness unconscious creative processes.  Stark suggests Burroughs reference to semen in the Naked Lunch as  'the Thin White Rope' may have influenced the name of the Thin White Duke.

Characteristics
At first glance, the Thin White Duke appeared more conventional than Bowie's previously flamboyant glam incarnations. Sporting well-groomed blonde hair and wearing a simple, cabaret-style wardrobe consisting of a white shirt, black trousers, and a waistcoat, the Duke was a hollow man who sang songs of romance with an agonised intensity while feeling nothing, "dry ice masquerading as fire". The persona has been described as "a mad aristocrat", "an amoral zombie", and "an emotionless Aryan superman". Bowie himself described the character as "A very Aryan, fascist type; a would-be romantic with absolutely no emotion at all but who spouted a lot of neo-romance."

Controversy
The Thin White Duke was a controversial figure. While being interviewed in the persona in 1975 and 1976, Bowie made statements about Adolf Hitler and Nazi Germany that some interpreted as expressing sympathy for fascism or even promoting fascism. The controversy deepened in May 1976 when, while acknowledging a group of fans outside of London Victoria station, he was photographed making what some alleged to be a Nazi salute. Bowie denied this, saying that he was simply waving and the photographer captured his image mid-wave.

As early as 1976, Bowie began disavowing his allegedly pro-fascist comments and said that he was misunderstood. In an interview that year in the Daily Express, he explained that while performing in his various characters, "I'm Pierrot. I'm Everyman. What I'm doing is theatre, and only theatre ... What you see on stage isn't sinister. It's pure clown. I'm using myself as a canvas and trying to paint the truth of our time on it. The white face, the baggy pants they're Pierrot, the eternal clown putting over the great sadness." In 1977 (after retiring the Duke), Bowie stated that "I have made my two or three glib, theatrical observations on English society and the only thing I can now counter with is to state that I am not a fascist".

In later years, Bowie called the mid-1970s "the darkest days of my life" due to "astronomical" usage of cocaine and amphetamines. For much of 1976, he was obsessed with Satanic symbols, remained awake for days at a time, and lived on a diet of red peppers, milk, and hard drugs. In subsequent interviews, he blamed his erratic behavior and fascination with Nazi Germany and the occult during his Thin White Duke period on drug-induced paranoia and depression, and claimed that his mental state was such that he could not remember the late-1975 recording sessions for Station to Station. "It was a dangerous period for me," he explained. "I was at the end of my tether physically and emotionally and had serious doubts about my sanity." Eventually, he began to see the Thin White Duke as "a nasty character indeed", and later, "an ogre".

Aftermath
In an attempt to salvage his mental and physical health, Bowie left California's drug-fueled social scene for Europe in late 1976, staying in Geneva, Switzerland, for a time before joining his friend Iggy Pop in West Berlin in early 1977. Though he did not publicly retire the Thin White Duke as he had Ziggy Stardust, Bowie did not appear in the persona after settling in Europe.

Bowie lived in West Berlin for almost two years, during which time he moved on both musically and personally with his "Berlin Trilogy" albums (Low, "Heroes", and Lodger) in collaboration with Brian Eno and Tony Visconti. He also produced Pop's albums The Idiot and Lust for Life.

See also

 Ola Hudson

References

External links
 

Alter egos
David Bowie
Fictional characters introduced in 1975
Fictional dukes and duchesses
Race-related controversies in music
Fictional singers
1975 controversies